Robert Scott Weir (1 May 1953 – 4 October 2018) was a Scottish cricketer. He played in four first-class and ten List A matches for the Scotland cricket team from 1975 to 1984. He was also a helicopter pilot for the RAF, and was awarded with the Air Force Cross in 1993.

References

External links
 

1953 births
2018 deaths
20th-century Royal Air Force personnel
Cricketers from Glasgow
Helicopter pilots
Recipients of the Air Force Cross (United Kingdom)
Scottish cricketers